Victoria Helen McCrae Duncan (née MacFarlane, 25 November 1897 – 6 December 1956) was a Scottish medium best known as the last person to be imprisoned under the Witchcraft Act 1735 for fraudulent claims. She was famous for producing ectoplasm which was proven to be made from cheesecloth.

Early life
Victoria Helen MacFarlane was born in Callander, Perthshire on 25 November 1897, the daughter of Archibald McFarlane, a slater, and Isabella Rattray. At school, she alarmed her fellow pupils with her dire prophecies and hysterical behaviour, to the distress of her mother (a member of the Presbyterian church). After leaving school, she worked at Dundee Royal Infirmary, and in 1916 she married Henry Duncan, a cabinet maker and wounded war veteran, who was supportive of her supposed paranormal talents. A mother of six, she also worked part-time in a bleach factory.

Practising medium

In 1926 she developed from clairvoyant to physical medium by offering séances in which she claimed to be able to permit the spirits of recently deceased persons to materialise, by emitting ectoplasm from her mouth.

In 1928, the photographer Harvey Metcalfe attended a series of séances at the house of Duncan. During a séance he took various flash photographs of Duncan and her alleged "materialization" spirits including her spirit guide "Peggy". The photographs that were taken reveal the spirits to be fraudulently produced, such as a doll made from a painted papier-mâché mask draped in an old sheet.

In 1931, the London Spiritualist Alliance (LSA) examined Duncan's method. An early examination of pieces of Duncan's ectoplasm revealed it was made of cheesecloth, paper mixed with the white of egg and lavatory paper stuck together. One of Duncan's tricks was to swallow and regurgitate some of her ectoplasm, and she was persuaded to swallow a tablet of methylene blue before one of her séances by the LSA committee to rule out any chance of this trick being performed, and because of this no ectoplasm appeared. The committee in a report concluded that the "material was swallowed by Mrs Duncan at some time previous to the sitting and subsequently regurgitated by her for the purpose of exhibition."

Harry Price investigation

A piece of ectoplasm from one of Duncan's early séances was obtained and secured in a bottle of distilled water. It was given to the psychical researcher Harry Price who was originally enthusiastic about the sample. However, when he gave the sample to a chemist for an analysis it was discovered to be made from egg white mixed with chemicals. Price would later duplicate Duncan's ectoplasm with similar substances.

In 1931, Price paid Duncan £50 to perform a number of test séances. She was suspected of swallowing cheesecloth which was then regurgitated as "ectoplasm". Price had proven through analysis of a sample of ectoplasm produced by Duncan that it was made of cheesecloth. She reacted violently at attempts to X-ray her, running from the laboratory and making a scene in the street, where her husband had to restrain her, destroying the controlled nature of the test. According to Price in a report of the mediumship of Duncan:

Price in his report published photographs of Duncan in his laboratory that revealed fake ectoplasm made from cheesecloth, rubber gloves and cut-out heads from magazine covers which she pretended to her audiences were spirits. Psychologist William McDougall, who attended two of the séances, pronounced her "whole performance fraudulent" in an appendix to the report.

Following the report written by Price, Duncan's former maid Mary McGinlay confessed in detail to having aided Duncan in her mediumship tricks, and Duncan's husband admitted that the ectoplasm materializations were the result of regurgitation.

Duncan frequently had nosebleeds during séances; William Brown suggested that this was another of Duncan's hiding places for her fake ectoplasm. In 1936, psychical researcher Nandor Fodor offered money to Duncan if she would be filmed with an infrared camera during a séance; she refused.

1933 conviction 

In a séance on 6 January 1933 in Edinburgh, it is alleged that the spirit of a little girl called Peggy emerged in the séance room. A sitter named Esson Maule grabbed her and the lights were turned on and the spirit was revealed to be made from a stockinette undervest. The police were called and Duncan was prosecuted and fined £10. The undervest was used as evidence which led to Duncan's conviction of fraudulent mediumship at the Edinburgh Sheriff Court trial on 11 May 1933.

The spiritualist journal Light endorsed the court decision that Duncan was fraudulent and supported Price's investigation that revealed her ectoplasm was cheesecloth. Duncan's husband was also suspected of acting as her accomplice by hiding her fake ectoplasm.

Ectoplasm sample

Historian Malcolm Gaskill, who examined holdings from the Society for Psychical Research at the Cambridge University Library, found a sample of Duncan's ectoplasm. The ectoplasm proved to be made from a length of artificial silk. In 2018, the sample was displayed at the Spellbound exhibition on the history of magic at the Ashmolean Museum in Oxford. The sample is now held at Cambridge University Library and a photograph can be seen on the library website.

HMS Barham sinking
During World War II, in November 1941, Duncan held a séance in Portsmouth at which she claimed the spirit materialization of a sailor told her HMS Barham had been sunk. Because the sinking of HMS Barham was revealed, in strict confidence, only to the relatives of casualties, and not announced to the public until late January 1942, the Navy started to take an interest in her activities. Two lieutenants were among her audience at a séance on 14 January 1944. One of these was a Lieutenant Worth who was not impressed as a white cloth figure had appeared behind the curtains claiming to be his aunt but he had no deceased aunt. In the same sitting another figure appeared claiming to be his sister but Worth replied his sister was alive and well. Worth was disgusted by the séance and reported it to the police. This was followed up on 19 January, when undercover policemen arrested her at another séance as a white-shrouded manifestation appeared. This proved to be Duncan herself, in a white cloth which she attempted to conceal when discovered, and she was arrested.

Researcher Graeme Donald wrote that Duncan could have easily found out about HMS Barham and she had no genuine psychic powers. According to Donald:

A leak concerning HMS Barham was later discovered. A secretary of the First Sea Lord had been indiscreet to Professor Michael Postan of the Ministry of Economic Warfare. Postan said that he believed he had been told officially, and was not arrested.

Duncan was found to be in possession of a mocked-up HMS Barham hat-band. This apparently related to an alleged manifestation of the spirit of a dead sailor on HMS Barham, although Duncan apparently did not know that after 1939 sailors' hat bands carried only 'H.M.S.' and did not identify their ship. She was initially arrested under section 4 of the Vagrancy Act 1824, a minor offence tried by magistrates. The authorities regarded the case as more serious, and eventually discovered section 4 of the Witchcraft Act 1735, covering fraudulent "spiritual" activity, which was triable before a jury. Charged alongside her for conspiracy to contravene this Act were Ernest and Elizabeth Homer, who operated the Psychic centre in Portsmouth, and Frances Brown, who was Duncan's agent and went with her to set up séances. There were seven counts, two of conspiracy to contravene the Witchcraft Act, two of obtaining money by false pretences, and three of the common law offence of public mischief. The prosecution may be explained by the mood of suspicion prevailing at the time: the authorities were afraid that she could continue to reveal classified information, whatever her source was. There were also concerns that she was exploiting the recently bereaved, as the Recorder noted when passing sentence.

Duncan's trial for fraudulent witchcraft was a minor cause célèbre in wartime London. Alfred Dodd, a historian and senior Freemason, testified he was convinced she was authentic. The trial was complicated by the fact that a police raid on the séance in Portsmouth, leading to the arrest of Helen Duncan, yielded no physical evidence of the fraudulent use of cheesecloth, and was therefore based entirely on witness testimony, the majority of which denied any wrongdoing. Duncan was barred by the judge from demonstrating her alleged powers as part of her defence against being fraudulent. The jury brought in a guilty verdict on count one, and the judge then discharged them from giving verdicts on the other counts, as he held that they were alternative offences for which Duncan might have been convicted had the jury acquitted her on the first count. Duncan was imprisoned for nine months, Brown for four months and the Homers were bound over. After the verdict, Winston Churchill wrote a memo to Home Secretary Herbert Morrison, complaining about the misuse of court resources on the "obsolete tomfoolery" of the charge.

Repeal of the Witchcraft Act
In 1944, Duncan was one of the last people convicted under the Witchcraft Act 1735, which made falsely claiming to procure spirits a crime. She was sentenced to nine months' imprisonment. When convicted, she cried out "I have done nothing; is there a God?".

On her release in 1945, Duncan promised to stop conducting séances, but she was arrested during another one in 1956. She died at her home in Edinburgh a short time later. Duncan's trial almost certainly contributed to the repeal of the Witchcraft Act, which was contained in the Fraudulent Mediums Act 1951 promoted by Walter Monslow, Labour Member of Parliament for Barrow-in-Furness. The campaign to repeal the Act had largely been led by Thomas Brooks, another Labour MP, who was a spiritualist. Duncan's original conviction still stood, and it was the subject of a sustained campaign to have it overturned.

Death
She died at her home in Edinburgh, on 6 December 1956, a short time after another seance. It is believed by  spiritualists that Helen Duncan died as a result of the sudden impact of ectoplasm snapping back into her body when the police that raided her séance turned on the light.  Contrary to what these spiritualists have written, it is unlikely that there was anything unusual about Duncan's death, nor was it caused by the police disturbing her "trance." Duncan's medical records indicated that she had a long history of poor health, and as early as 1944 she was described as an obese woman who could move only slowly as she suffered from heart trouble.

Legacy
After her death, Duncan was cited in paranormal and parapsychological books as an example of a fraudulent medium. However, she retained supporters amongst the spiritualist community. On this, Jenny Hazelgrove has noted:

The psychical researcher Simeon Edmunds also noted that spiritualists have a history of ignoring the evidence of fraud in the Duncan case. He criticized the spiritualist press such as Psychic News for biased reporting and distorting facts. Science writer Mary Roach in her book Spook: Science Tackles the Afterlife (2007) favorably mentioned Price's methods in debunking Duncan as a fraudulent medium.

Inspired by her legacy, new wave of British heavy metal band Seventh Son recorded and released a song 'The Last Witch in England' in 2009, depicting her life and her 'prediction' of the sinking of HMS Barham.

The naval investigation and subsequent trial was dramatized as a radio play. The Last Witch Trial by Melissa Murray, starring Joanna Monro as Duncan and Indira Varma as the undercover investigator, was broadcast by BBC Radio 4 on 4 June 2010.

Descendants and supporters of Duncan have campaigned on several occasions to have her posthumously pardoned of witchcraft charges. Petitions for a posthumous pardon were rejected by the Scottish Parliament in 2001, 2008, and 2012. Duncan's supporters maintain a website and online petition where they continue to campaign for her pardon.

Gallery

Notes

References
 Mary Armour. (2001). Helen Duncan: My Living Has Not Been in Vain. Pembridge Publishing. 
 Maurice Barbanell. (1945). The Case of Helen Duncan. Psychic Press.
 Gena Brealey, Kay Hunter. The Two Worlds of Helen Duncan. Saturday Night Press Publications. 
 Manfred Cassirer. (1996). Medium on Trial. PN Publishing. 
 Simeon Edmunds. (1966). Spiritualism: A Critical Survey. Aquarian Press.  
 Robert Hartley. (2007). Helen Duncan The Mystery Show Trial. HPR Publishing. 
 Alan Crossley. (1976). The Story of Helen Duncan: Materialisation Medium. Arthur H. Stockwell Ltd. 
 Malcolm Gaskill. "Britain's Last Witch". History Today 51 (2001).
 Malcolm Gaskill. (2001). Hellish Nell: Last of Britain's Witches. Fourth Estate. 
 Renée Haynes. (1982). The Society for Psychical Research 1882–1982: A History. MacDonald & Co. 
 Jenny Hazelgrove. (2000). Spiritualism and British Society Between the Wars. Manchester University Press. 
 "Hellish Nell". The Daily Mirror. 6 December 2006: 24.
 Paul Kurtz. (1985). A Skeptic's Handbook of Parapsychology. Prometheus Books.  
 Georgess McHargue. (1972). Facts, Frauds, and Phantasms: A Survey of the Spiritualist Movement. Doubleday. 
 Helena Normanton. (1945). The Trial of Mrs Duncan. London: Jarrolds.
 Harry Price. (1931). Regurgitation and the Duncan Mediumship. (Bulletin I of the National Laboratory of Psychical Research, 120pp with 44 illustrations.)
 Harry Price. (1933). The Cheese-Cloth Worshippers. In Leaves from a Psychist's Case-Book. Victor Gollancz Ltd.
 Harry Price. (1936). Confessions of a Ghost-Hunter. Putnam.
 Harry Price. (1942). Search for Truth: My Life for Psychical Research. Collins.
 Mary Roach. (2007). Six Feet Over: Adventures in the Afterlife. Canongate Books Ltd. 
 Nina Shandler. (2006). The Strange Case of Hellish Nell. Da Capo Press. 
 Roy Stemman. (1976). The Supernatural. Danbury Press.  
 Paul Tabori. (1961). The Art of Folly. Prentice-Hall International, Inc. 
 Paul Tabori. (1966). Harry Price: The Biography of a Ghosthunter. Living Books. 
Donald J. West. (1946). The Trial of Mrs Duncan. Proceedings of the Society for Psychical Research 48: 32–64.

External links
 Inside story: 301 Copnor Road by Roger Wilkes
 Article in World War II magazine about Duncan and HMS Barham
 The Harry Price Website – Psychical researcher Harry Price's 1931 examination of Helen Duncan's séance room practices.
 Campaign to have Helen Duncan posthumously pardoned

1897 births
1956 deaths
British women in World War II
Paranormal hoaxes
People from Stirling (council area)
Scottish fraudsters
Scottish spiritual mediums
Witchcraft in Scotland
20th-century Scottish businesspeople